Shaban Sejdiu (born 6 May 1959) is Macedonian retired freestyle wrestler.

An ethnic Macedonian Albanian, Sejdiu, as part of the Skopje Wrestling Club, was trained by notable coaches Risto Takov, who had also trained notable wrestlers Shaban Tërstena, Bajram Qorrolli, Abdulla Mehmeti, Mustaf Syla, Shend Kamberi and Adnan Elezi.

Sejdiu competed in the 1976 Summer Olympics, in the 1980 Summer Olympics, in the 1984 Summer Olympics, and in the 1988 Summer Olympics. He received bronze medals in both the Moscow and Los Angeles Olympics.

Sejdiu also competed in the 1977 and 1981 World Wrestling Championships, and received silver medals in both. Soviet wrestler and Olympic and Worlds gold medalist, Saypulla Absaidov, stopped him in both finals of the Moscow Olympics and the 1981 World Wrestling Championships.

His daughter Altuna is a successful singer in North Macedonia and Albania.

References

External links
 

1959 births
Living people
Albanians in North Macedonia
Macedonian male sport wrestlers
Olympic wrestlers of Yugoslavia
Olympic wrestlers of North Macedonia
Wrestlers at the 1976 Summer Olympics
Wrestlers at the 1980 Summer Olympics
Wrestlers at the 1984 Summer Olympics
Wrestlers at the 1988 Summer Olympics
Yugoslav male sport wrestlers
Olympic bronze medalists for Yugoslavia
Olympic medalists in wrestling
World Wrestling Championships medalists
Medalists at the 1984 Summer Olympics
Medalists at the 1980 Summer Olympics
Mediterranean Games gold medalists for Yugoslavia
Competitors at the 1975 Mediterranean Games
Competitors at the 1979 Mediterranean Games
Mediterranean Games medalists in wrestling
Universiade medalists in wrestling
Universiade bronze medalists for Yugoslavia